Mari Emmanuel (born 19 July 1970) is an Iraqi-born Assyrian Australian Metropolitan bishop of the Ancient Assyrian Church of the East who presides over the Diocese of Australia and New Zealand.

Early life
Mar Mari Emmanuel was born Robert Shlimon at T1 station in Haditha, Iraq and he settled in Australia in the early 1980s. He worked as a bank manager in the 1990s, before becoming a deacon and then later a reverend in the 2000s.

Tenure
In August 2011, Mar Yacoub Daniel and Mar Zaia Khoshaba consecrated Mar Mari Emmanuel as a suffragan bishop for the archdiocese of Australia and New Zealand, assisting the Metropolitan of Australia and New Zealand. Previously known as reverend Emmanuel Shlimon, he adopted the episcopal name of 'Mari Emmanuel' (after Saint Mari) at the time of becoming a bishop. In July 2013, while on a visit to Australia, Mar Addai II bestowed the patriarchal confirmation upon Mari Emmanuel.

In August 2014, he was suspended by the Patriarch, Addai II. However, since there was no evidence for accusations he had since returned to the church and remained as metropolitan bishop. In January 2015, Mari Emmanuel established an independent church in Wakeley which is currently known as Christ The Good Shepherd Church. In 2016, Mari Emmanuel was received into communion with metropolitan, Toma Gewargis, who paid a visit to the church later that year. 

Since 2017, Mari Emmanuel annually visits the United States and Canada where he conducts preaching ministries in several states such as Illinois, Arizona, California and Ontario. He has also paid several visits to the separatist and anti-patriarchal parish in Modesto, California, and the congregation acknowledge him as a spiritual prelate alongside the two metropolitans and recite his name in their litanies. Mari Emmanuel's 'Christ The Good Shepherd Church' also celebrates Christmas according to the Gregorian calendar date in line with the patriarchal decree of June 2010, making it a new calendarist church rather than an old one.

Controversies

Suspension
Addai II visited the parishes of the archdiocese of Australia and New Zealand in 2013, and during his visit gave Mari Emmanuel the patriarchal confirmation, though he disapproved of a number of activities related to the bishop and issued a deadline in order for these activities to be repelled. These disapprovals varied from a range of different areas such as liturgical, theological and social conduct of the bishop. The deadline expired, and Addai II went ahead and suspended Mari Emmanuel in July 2014 for disobeying the Nicene Creed canons promulgated by the First Council of Nicaea in AD 325.

COVID-19
On 19 July 20, 2021, amid the SARS-CoV-2 Delta variant outbreaks and the lockdown in Sydney, the bishop presented an online sermon that reprimanded the COVID-19 vaccinations and lockdowns, stating that the coronavirus is "just another type of the flu, no more, no less". His YouTube video had been viewed by hundreds of thousands of people, many of whom agreeing with the bishop on how the pandemic impacts society's mental health and the economy of Western Sydney. In his video, he implored the Australian prime minister Scott Morrison and NSW premier Gladys Berejiklian to do more and aid those with financial and emotional adversity, in addition to saying, "have we really lost the plot?". Though the Australian government discouraged the video's information, with NSW health minister Brad Hazzard responding, "anti-vaxxers obviously live in another universe", stating how serious and fatal the virus is.

Views on other topics
On March 2023, the bishop presented an online sermon commenting on a video taken a few days before. The video shows a group of anti LGBT activists being barred from entering a catholic church.
 During his sermon, he attacked the priest for being pro LGBT and asked his bishop to excummunicate him. The video was widely shared on social media.

References

External links
Mar Mari on his false allegations
Christ the Shepherd Church (official website)
"What Has Become of Australia", speech where the bishop slams COVID-19 lockdowns

Living people
1970 births
Ancient Church of the East
Iraqi emigrants to Australia
Iraqi Assyrian people
Australian people of Assyrian descent
Australian people of Iraqi descent
21st-century bishops
People excommunicated by the Church of the East
Bishops of Syriac Christianity
Syriac Christians
Iraqi bishops
Metropolitan bishops
Clergy from Sydney